Cumbe is a municipality located in the Brazilian state of Sergipe. Its population was 3,998 (2020) and its area is 129 km².

See also
 Combe

References

Municipalities in Sergipe